Tomaszów Lubelski  is a town in south-eastern Poland with 19,365 inhabitants (2017). Situated in the Lublin Voivodeship, near Roztocze National Park, it is the capital of Tomaszów Lubelski County.

History

The town was founded at the end of the 16th century by Jan Zamoyski as Jelitowo. It is known by its current name since 1613 when it was renamed after Zamoyski's son, Tomasz. It obtained its city charter in 1621. It was administratively located in the Bełz Voivodeship in the Lesser Poland Province of Poland. The area around the city saw serious fighting in 1914 during World War I.

On September 17–26, 1939, during the joint German-Soviet invasion of Poland which started World War II, the Battle of Tomaszów Lubelski was fought between Poland and Germany. The town was bombed by the Germans and eventually found itself under German occupation. The town's Jewish community, which numbered over 5,600 in 1939 at the start of the war, was persecuted by the occupiers in the Holocaust. The Nazi Germans first placed the Jews in a ghetto established in the town, then exterminated them in 1942 at Bełżec extermination camp located a few km. south of the town. The Jewish community ceased to exist.

In 1975–1998, the town was administratively located in the Zamość Voivodeship.

Education
In the town there are two faculties of Catholic University of Lublin (Legal and Economic Sciences). It has two high schools (Bartosz Głowacki High School and Władysław Sikorski High School), three technical colleges, two gymnasiums and two primary schools.

Culture

International Folk Festival Roztocze is a popular annual music festival organized since 1990. Since 2008 the town council organizes reconstructions of Battle of Tomaszów.

Sports
Tomaszów is the home for the football team Tomasovia.

Media
There are two main newspapers published weekly in Tomaszów Lubelski. First of them, ReWizje Tomaszowskie, is financed by the town council. Second of them, Tygodnik Tomaszowski, belongs to a private company.

Twin towns
Tomaszów Lubelski is twinned with:

 Grigiškės, Lithuania
 Kivertsi, Ukraine
 Zhovkva, Ukraine

Notable people 
 Mordechai Yosef Leiner (1801–1854), Hasidic thinker
 Menachem Mendel of Kotzk, (1787–1859), Hasidic thinker
 Joanna Pacuła (born 1957), actress
 Leon Pinsker (1821–1891), Zionist activist
 Zygmunt Sochan (1909–1998), footballer and member of the Polish resistance movement in World War II
 Monika Skinder (born 2001), cross-country skier
 Marek Zub (born 1964), football manager
 Wojciech Żukowski (born 1964), member of the parliament, Law and Justice

External links

 Tomaszów County website
 Old pictures of Tomaszów
 Tomaszów virtual tour

Notes

 Catholic University of Lublin Official website

Cities and towns in Lublin Voivodeship
Tomaszów Lubelski County
16th-century establishments in Poland
Populated places established in the 16th century
Lublin Governorate
Kholm Governorate
Lublin Voivodeship (1919–1939)
Holocaust locations in Poland